NT-1  may refer to:
New Standard D-29, a trainer aircraft produced in the US from 1929 to 1930
Network termination 1, a functional grouping of customer-premises equipment in Integrated Services Digital Networks (ISDN)
Mackenzie Highway, abbreviated NT-1